Loÿs Papon (1533–1599) was a 16th-century French playwright born in Montbrison in the Forez province.

Short biography 
He animated a small literary circle, sometimes in the Goutelas castle inherited from his father, sometimes at the Château de la Bastie d'Urfé.

We still have a didactic poem from him, Traité des ris, an Epistre à Tres Illustre Princesse Loyse, Reyne de France, and tragedies, in particular La Pastorelle, a politico-religious spectacle which was presented on 27 February 1588 in Montbrison and is considered the first French opera.

He was the model for the druid Adamas in L'Astrée.

Works 
 La Pastorelle sur les victoires obtenues contre les Allemands, reytres, lansquenets suisses et français, rebelles à Dieu et au roi très chrétien l'an 1588.

See also 
 French renaissance literature

References 

16th-century French dramatists and playwrights
1533 births
1599 deaths